Zhao Yang (born 11 December 1985) is a Chinese former footballer.

Career statistics

Club

Notes

References

1985 births
Living people
Chinese footballers
Association football midfielders
Singapore Premier League players